SJD Accountancy is a UK-based accountancy firm that provides accountancy services to contractors with private limited companies.

History
Formed in 1992 by entrepreneur Simon Dolan who now owns Dolan Accountancy.

In September 2014 Simon Dolan sold SJD Accountancy. It was acquired for £67 million on the same day that Nixon Williams, was also purchased by Sovereign Capital, a specialist UK private equity firm.

Selected awards
 Best Contractor Accountant - Large by ContractorUK readers in 2018
Best Contractor Accountant - Large by ContractorUK readers in 2017.
British Accountancy Awards 2011 Winners for 'New Accountant of the Year'.
 UK Customer Experience Award Winners 2011 for ‘Best Professional Team of the Year’. 
 Best Contractor Accountant by ContractorUK readers from 2007 to 2016.
 Accountancy Age winners in 2004 and 2007 for ‘Small firm of the year’.
 The Sunday Times 100 Best Small Companies – Position 26 in 2009 and 41 in 2008.

References 

Accounting firms of the United Kingdom